The Red Lily Wind Farm is a Red Lily Wind Energy Partnership facility situated north west of Moosomin, Saskatchewan, in the Rural Municipality of Moosomin.  The facility is owned by Concorde Pacific and developed and constructed by Algonquin Power. The wind farm will consist of sixteen V82-1.65 MW wind turbines, for a total of 25 MW.  At a cost of $60 million, work on the project started in 2010, with the facility coming online (at 26.4 MW) in February 2011.  The facility is being constructed under a long-term, 25-year, power purchase agreement with SaskPower.

Description
Installed in 2010, the wind farm consists of 16, V82-1.65 MW wind turbines.

See also

List of wind farms in Canada

References

Wind farms in Saskatchewan